The first Mandala ("book") of the Rigveda has 191 hymns. Together with Mandala 10, it forms the latest part of the Rigveda. Its composition likely dates to the late vedic period (1000-500 BCE) or the Early Iron Age (around 1000 BCE).

Contents
Hymn 1.1 is addressed to Agni, arranged so that the name of this god is the first word of the Rigveda. The remaining hymns are mainly addressed to Agni and Indra. Hymns 1.154 to 1.156 are addressed to Vishnu. Hymn 1.3 is dedicated to the Ashvins. Hymn 1.164.46, part of a hymn to the Vishvadevas, is often quoted as an example of emerging monism or monotheism. It forms the basis for the well-known statement "Truth is one, sages call it by various names":

"They call him Indra, Mitra, Varuna, Agni / and he is heavenly nobly-winged Garutman."
"To what is One, sages give many a title / they call it Agni, Yama, Matarisvan." (trans. Griffith) 
 – Rigveda 1.164.46

Interpretation
Max Muller described the character of the Vedic hymns as a form of henotheism, in which "numerous deities are successively praised as if they were one ultimate God." According to Graham, in the Vedic society it was believed that humans could contact the gods through the spoken utterances of the Vedic seers, and "the One Real" (ekam sat) in 1.164.46 refers to Vāc, both "speech" and goddess of speech, the "one ultimate, supreme God", and "one supreme Goddess." In later Vedic literature, "Speech or utterance is also identified with the supreme power or transcendent reality," and "equated with Brahman in this sense." Frauwallner states that "many gods are traced back to the one Godhead. The one (ekam) is not meant adjectively as a quality but as a substantive, as the upholding centre of reality."

The Vedic henotheism may have grown out of a growing recognition of a "unitary essence beyond all the deities," in which the deities were conceptualized as pluralistic manifestations of the same divine essence beyond this plurality. The Vedic era conceptualization of the divine or the One, states Jeaneane Fowler, is more abstract than a monotheistic God, it is the Reality behind the phenomenal universe, which it treats as "limitless, indescribable, absolute principle", thus the Vedic divine is something of a panentheism. In late Vedic era, with the start of Upanishadic age (~800-600 BCE), from the henotheistic, panentheistic concepts emerge the concepts which scholars variously call nondualism or monism, as well as forms of non-theism.

Selected hymns

Publications
The editio princeps of the book is due to Friedrich August Rosen, published posthumously in 1838. It was the earliest edition of a Rigvedic Mandala, predating Max Müller's edition of the entire Rigveda by more than 50 years.

References

Sources

External links

Rigveda